The Marching Southerners is the marching band of Jacksonville State University in Alabama. Composed of students from all over the country, the Southerners and Marching Ballerinas perform for thousands each season.

History
The first band at Jacksonville State Normal School was formed in 1923–24. At that time, students only attended the school for two years and there was no full-time director, which hindered growth of the band in the early years. In 1930, the college was renamed Jacksonville State Teachers College, reflecting an increased role in higher education for the institution. The Great Depression and World War II put development of the band on hold.

After the war, Walter A. Mason became head of the music department at the college. A veteran, he turned to fellow Army musician J. Eugene Duncan who he asked to become the band's first full-time director in 1948.

The Marching Southerners were the 2021 recipients of the Sudler Trophy, the highest award for collegiate marching band.

Music and marching Style
John T. Finley took over the director position in 1951 and immediately made changes to the band's musical and visual style. Finley removed the sousaphones, cornets and small-bore trombones, and replaced them with trumpets and bass trombones: instruments more usually associated with orchestras. The most radical instrumental change was the adoption of the C.G. Conn 20-J upright recording bass as the band's lead tuba, and Jacksonville State remains the only university marching band to use this heavy concert tuba on the field. Other musical changes included a departure from military-style marches in favor of slower, more dynamic, orchestral and symphonic, Broadway and Latin jazz pieces.

Visually, the band abandoned military-style block drill in favor of precision marching and wide-open company front formations: designed to achieve uniformity in step height and body carriage, whilst the company front formation helped to project the sound of the band. Finley also adopted a dance line as a visual focus instead of the majorette lines seen in more traditional marching bands, christening them the Marching Ballerinas.

Primary music arrangers for the Southerners include David L. Walters (1960s-early 1990s), Mark Fifer (1995-2004), and Justin Williams (2005–present), as well as percussion program head Clint Gillespie (1997–present).

The name "Southerners"
In 1956, the Marching Ballerinas were organized, and the band began attracting more attention. The band received its name, the Southerners, in 1958.

Incidentally, Norman L. Padgett is credited with naming the band. The band's charter president, Harold Summerville, class of '60, of Bowden, Ga., recalls, "On April 21, 1958, I presented a letter of appreciation to Norman L. Padgett. It was signed by Dr. Finley and [me] at the beginning of band rehearsal that day thanking [Mr. Padgett] for his submission of the name The Southerners."

Despite the commonly used name ("The Marching Southerners"), according to the JSU Manual of Style and Usage, Point 7, the official name of the band at Jacksonville State is simply "The Southerners": the "Marching" title only being applied to the Marching Ballerinas.

Directors

 1948 J. Eugene Duncan
 1951 John T. Finley
 1959 John Knox (interim director)
 1961 David L. Walters
 1991 M. Scott McBride
1994 Kenneth G. Bodiford

Notable performances

1965 – Inaugural parade for U.S. President Lyndon Johnson

1976 – National Bicentennial Celebration Parade in Philadelphia, PA

1996 – 70th Annual Macy's Thanksgiving Day Parade in New York City. A segment of the Southerners' performance can be seen in the opening scene of Episode 9.08 of Friends ("The One with Rachel's Other Sister"), which originally aired on Nov. 21, 2002.

1998 – First performance at the Atlanta Bands of America Regional at the Georgia Dome

1999 – B.O.A. Grand Nationals at the RCA Dome in Indianapolis

2002 – B.O.A. Grand Nationals at the RCA Dome in Indianapolis

2006 – The Marching Southerners celebrated their 50th anniversary with a performance that included 1,500 former Southerners alumni, during halftime of Jacksonville State University's college football game against Samford University.

2012 – The Southerners led the New Year's Day Parade in London, England, which also kicked off the 2012 Summer Olympics celebrations and Queen Elizabeth II's Diamond Jubilee.

2016 – The Southerners played on the U.S.S Missouri in honor of the 75th anniversary of Pearl Harbor.

Additionally, the Southerners perform regularly at the Bands of America contest in Atlanta, and they host a Bands of America contest in Jacksonville, Alabama.

Show Summary (1956-2021) 
Source:

Related competitive units
There are no organized competitions for college marching bands in the Southeast, so the Marching Southerners do not engage in direct competition with other college bands. However, Jacksonville State University sponsors several competitive marching and pageantry units that draw their membership in whole, or in part, from the marching band:

JSU Center Stage winter guard, a member of Winter Guard International and the Southeastern Color Guard Circuit competing in the Independent Open class.
JSU Diamond Girls, a dance team that competes throughout the Southeast.
An indoor drumline that regularly competes in the marching percussion competition at Percussive Arts Society's annual convention (PASIC), which they won in 1999.

References

External links
 The Marching Southerners

College marching bands in the United States
Jacksonville State University
Musical groups established in 1948
Musical groups from Alabama
1956 establishments in Alabama